Christian Hugh Howard (born November 18, 1965) is an American former professional baseball relief pitcher. He played in Major League Baseball (MLB) during 1993–1995 with the Chicago White Sox, Boston Red Sox, and Texas Rangers.

Career
Howard played college baseball at the University of Miami. In 1985, he played collegiate summer baseball with the Wareham Gatemen of the Cape Cod Baseball League. He was initially selected by the Milwaukee Brewers in the January 1985 MLB draft, but did not sign. He was later selected by the New York Yankees in the 1986 MLB draft. He was in the Yankees organization until May 1990, when he was released. He then signed with the Cleveland Indians organization, but was released the following month. In January 1991, Howard signed with the Chicago White Sox organization.
 
In a three-season major-league career, 1993–1995, Howard posted a 2–0 record with a 3.13 earned run average (ERA) and one save in 44 appearances, including six games finished, 25 strikeouts, 16 walks, and 46 innings pitched. His one save came as a member of the Boston Red Sox on August 6, 1994, during the front end of a doubleheader against Cleveland—Howard pitched four innings, allowing one hit and one unearned run while preserving the win for Aaron Sele.

References

External links

Venezuelan Professional Baseball League statistics

1965 births
Living people
Albany-Colonie Yankees players
American expatriate baseball players in Canada
Baseball players from Massachusetts
Binghamton Mets players
Birmingham Barons players
Boston Red Sox players
Caribes de Oriente players
American expatriate baseball players in Venezuela
Chicago White Sox players
Fort Lauderdale Yankees players
Gulf Coast Mets players
Gulf Coast Yankees players
Gulf Coast White Sox players
Kinston Indians players
Major League Baseball pitchers
Miami Hurricanes baseball players
Nashville Sounds players
Oneonta Yankees players
Pawtucket Red Sox players
Prince William Yankees players
Sarasota Red Sox players
Sportspeople from Lynn, Massachusetts
St. Lucie Mets players
Texas Rangers players
Vancouver Canadians players
Wareham Gatemen players
Miami Dade Sharks baseball players
People from Nahant, Massachusetts